FDMS may refer to:
 Father Dueñas Memorial School, in Guam
 First Data Merchant Services
 Matsapha Airport, in Eswatini

See also 
 FDM (disambiguation)